Vrooman may refer to:

 Vrooman (surname)
 Vrooman Avenue School, a historic building in Amsterdam, New York, U.S.
 Vrooman Field, another name for Charles Watson Stadium, Conway, South Carolina, U.S.
 Vrooman's Point, Ontario, Canada
 Scott–Vrooman House, now Vrooman Mansion Bed and Breakfast, in Bloomington, Illinois, U.S.

See also
 Vroomanton, a ghost town in Ontario, Canada
 Vroman (disambiguation)